This article is a list of fictional swords in various pieces of literature, film and television. For swords originating in mythology and legend, see List of mythological swords. Swords that originate in epic poems, tales and chronicles that were taken at one time as a "true" accounting of history rather than being composed as works of fiction, such as Beowulf, The Tale of the Heike and the Kojiki of similar are not listed here, regardless of whether the swords themselves are believed by contemporary scholars to have existed historically.

Akita Yoshinobu: Sorcerous Stabber Orphen 
Baldanders: The sword of Heavenly Beings, used for transforming a Killing Doll into a humanlike body, transformations of males into females and transformations of humans into beasts. The name is of German etymology: "bald anders" means "soon to be different".

Lloyd Alexander: The Chronicles of Prydain 
Dyrnwyn: The sword of Prince Gwydion, made by Govannion the Lame by command of King Rhydderch Hael.

J.M. Barrie: Peter Pan 
Johnny Corkscrew: Smee's cutlass, so called because he would twist it into the wound after stabbing his opponents.

Terry Brooks: The Sword of Shannara 
The Sword of Leah: A sword carried by the Leah family for generations, later given the ability to cut through magic.
The Sword of Shannara: A magical sword with the power to reveal the truth of any being or situation. It is forged from magic and is indestructible.

Lewis Carroll: Jabberwocky 
 The Vorpal Sword: The blade made which went "snicker-Snack" when swung, it is used by the hero to battle the titular beast of the poem. Vorpal swords have later been used in many role-playing games. In Dungeons & Dragons, vorpal swords are known for their uncanny ability to sever heads, as compared to swords of sharpness, which merely cut off arms or legs.

Cassandra Clare: The Shadowhunter Chronicles 
Seraph Blades: Swords wielded by shadowhunters to kill demons. They have angelic powers and operate when an angel's name is called. They are forged by the Iron Sisters.
Glorious: The sword of the archangel Michael, used by Joshua at Jericho.
Cortana: Sword passed down through the Carstairs family. It has an inscription on the blade that reads: "I am Cortana, of the same steel and temper as Joyeuse and Durendel." 
Heosphorous: One of the Morgenstern blades. A short sword only the length of a forearm, it is made of black steel and has a decal of stars inscribed on the blade. 
Phaesphoros: The other Morgenstern blade, this one is a long sword and looks similar to its brother. 
Maellartach: One of the Mortal Instruments given to the Nephilim by the Angel Raziel. It is a large and beautiful sword, its most distinguishable feature being a guard that looks like a golden pair of wings. It is said to be the blade used to drive Adam and Eve from the Garden of Eden. It is also known as The Mortal Sword, the Soul Sword, and the Angel Blade.

Susan Cooper: The Dark is Rising Sequence 
 The Crystal Sword: A magical sword, commissioned by the Light, crafted in the magical Lost Lands by the Lost King. It is named Eirias; therefore, "blazing", also called sword of the sunrise. It burns with blue fire in the presence of the Dark. It can cut portals through magical barriers, as seen in Silver on the Tree, and is encased in a magical scabbard of invisibility. It is used by Bran Davies, the Pendragon, heir of King Arthur, to cut the one fully blossomed silver flower on the Midsummer's Tree, which is caught by Merriman.

Brian Daley: Coramonde 
Flarecore: The royal sword of the ruler of the Kingdom of Coramonde (plundered from and later returned to Vegana). Also known as Blazetongue, the sword can be made to ignite if the wielder knows the activating spell. This ability is usually restricted to the ruler, although the evil sorcerer Yardiff Bey also knows the spell.
Bar: True weapon of the rulers of Coramonde. Described as basket hilted, like a cavalry sabre but lighter, it has the property of being eternally sharp. (The Doomfarers of Coramonde, Ch. 2)
Dirge: Sword of the evil wizard Yard Bey, wounds caused by this sword never heal so even minor cuts eventually become fatal.

David Eddings: The Belgariad & The Malloreon 
 The Sword of the Rivan King / Iron-Grip's Sword: The sword that the main character Garion/Belgarion wields which has The Orb of Aldur in the pommel.
 Cthrek Goru / The Sword of Shadows: Wielded by the twisted god Torak.

Michael Ende: The Neverending Story 
Sikanda: Given to Bastian by Grograman. Only those who have eaten, drunk, and bathed in the flames of the Many-Colored Death, and ridden on his back, may touch the sword. Sikanda may only be used it when it leaps from its rusty sheath of its own volition. Drawing it intentionally brings great misfortune.

Steven Erikson: Malazan Book of the Fallen 
Dragnipur: The sword Dragnipur was a long, silver-hilted bastard sword, with an inky-black blade that absorbed all light. It was wielded first by Draconus, who had forged it, then Anomander Rake.
Chance: Chance was the name of a sword dedicated to Oponn. It was originally wielded by Ganoes Paran who gave it to Cotillion when he deemed that any luck it provided him had turned. Later it was wielded by Crokus Younghand.
Vengeance / Grief: Commissioned and wielded first by Anomander Rake, who named it "Vengeance". When Rake acquired Dragnipur, he passed Vengeance to his brother Andarist, who named it "Grief".

David Gemmell: Drenai Series 
The Swords of Night and Day: These are wielded by Olek Skilgannon 'the Damned' in White Wolf and The Swords of Night and Day. Powerful, yet inferior, copies of the Swords of Blood and Fire.
The Swords of Blood and Fire: Twin swords wielded by Decado in The Swords of Night and Day, and by Boranius in White Wolf. The original swords from which the Swords of Night and Day were copied.
Snaga: Although Druss' "axe's" name is Snaga, The Sender, The Blades of No Return. Druss exorcised the demon from it which is later used to imbue Gorben's sword with similar powers as the axe; causing Gorben to become insane.

Terry Goodkind: The Sword of Truth 
The Sword of Truth: Wielded by Richard Rahl. The sword has numerous powers, most notably that it rebels against being used on a target the wielder does not believe deserves to die, punishes its user after they have killed someone with it (especially someone who did not deserve to die), remembers the skills of its previous wielders, and if given to someone not worthy of the sword, will eventually transform them into a subhuman creature should the sword be removed from their possession for an extended period of time.

Robert A. Heinlein: Glory Road 
The Lady Vivamus: Described as a nearly straight saber, almost a rapier, with a bell guard, hand forged and of exquisite balance, used by Oscar Gordon in his mission to recover The Egg of the Phoenix.

Brian Jacques: Redwall 
Sword of Martin: Wielded by Martin the Warrior and numerous successors. Originally a rather ordinary blade, with a leather-bound hilt topped by a red pommel stone, it was broken by the wildcat queen Tsarmina Greeneyes when Martin was held captive. It was later reforged in the mountain fortress Salamandastron from a chunk of a meteorite, giving it an infinitely-hard blade. When Martin retired from the life of a warrior, he hid the sword within Redwall Abbey, and his spirit has since guided certain individuals he deems worthy to find it and take up his mantle. It was named "Ratdeath" by Abbot Mortimer after Matthias slew Cluny the Scourge.
Verminfate: A gigantic broadsword wielded by the badger lord Rawnblade Widestripe.
Rapscallion sword: Wielded by the Firstblade (leader) of the Rapscallion Army. One side of the blade was wavy, to convey the oceans, the other flat, to convey land—when thrown in the air, whatever side it landed on dictated how the army would travel. Gormad Tunn and his son, Damug Warfang, both rigged the hilt with a brass clip to ensure that the sword would land the way they wanted it to. It was broken in battle when Damug was slain by the badger lady Cregga Rose Eyes.

Robert Jordan: The Wheel of Time 
Callandor: A powerful sa'angreal, also known as The Sword that is not a Sword resides in the Stone of Tear (heart of the stone)
Heron Mark Sword: Swords borne by blademasters. Some are Power-wrought blades of Aes Sedai make, and thus unbreakable. A majority are crafted of more mundane stuff.

Fritz Leiber: Fafhrd and the Grey Mouser 
Graywand: The name of the longsword wielded by the barbarian, Fafhrd.
Scalpel: The Gray Mouser's thin-bladed rapier, often wielded in conjunction with Cat's Claw, his "hooked dirk".

C.S. Lewis: The Chronicles of Narnia 
Rhindon: Peter Pevensie's sword, which is given him, along with a shield, by Father Christmas. He uses it to slay the wolf Maugrim and wields it in battle against The White Witch. When the Pevensie children return to Narnia centuries later they recognize the ruins of their former castle after discovering the blade, which has not tarnished. He then takes it up again to lead the revolutionary army against the Telmarines.

George R.R. Martin: A Song of Ice and Fire 
Blackfyre: The Valyrian steel sword of Aegon I Targaryen. Carried by all Targaryen kings till Aegon IV who gave it to his bastard Daemon Blackfyre who rose in rebellion against the Targaryens, taking the sword's name for his house. Its whereabouts are currently unknown.
Brightroar: The ancestral Valyrian steel greatsword of House Lannister, lost when King Tommen II Lannister of the Rock sailed to Valyria and never returned.
Dark Sister: The Valyrian steel longsword wielded by Visenya Targaryen. The last known owner was Bloodraven.
Dawn: The ancestral greatsword of House Dayne, who bestow the title Sword of the Morning upon the sword's bearer. Forged of metal from the heart of a fallen star, it is 'pale as milkglass' and is said to be as sharp as Valyrian steel. Brought to Ashara Dayne by Eddard Stark after Ser Arthur Dayne's death.
Hearteater: Given to Joffrey Baratheon to replace the lost Lion's Tooth. The pommel is a ruby cut in the shape of a heart between a lion's jaws.
Heartsbane: The ancestral Valyrian steel two handed greatsword of House Tarly, currently in the possession of Lord Randyll Tarly.
Ice: The ancestral Valyrian steel two handed greatsword of House Stark. Following Eddard Stark's execution in King's Landing, it was melted down and reforged into two longswords, Widow's Wail and Oathkeeper.
Lady Forlorn: The ancestral Valyrian steel sword of House Corbray, it is currently in the possession of Ser Lyn Corbray.
Lightbringer: The sword of Azor Ahai, a legendary hero who is prophesied to drive away the Great Other. Thought to be a sword made of living fire, it is also known as the Red Sword of Heroes.
Lion's Tooth: Joffrey Baratheon's first sword. Small and ordinary.
Longclaw: The ancestral Valyrian steel bastard sword of House Mormont. It once had a bear's head for the pommel, but this was replaced by a snarling wolf's head of pale stone with chips of garnet for the eyes to reflect Jon Snow's Stark heritage.
Needle: A small Braavos sword forged in Winterfell by Mikken at the request of Jon Snow for Arya Stark.
Nightfall: The ancestral Valyrian steel blade of House Harlaw and currently wielded by Ser Harras Harlaw.
Oathkeeper: One of two Valyrian blades reforged by Tobho Mott from Ice. The blade was made for Ser Jaime Lannister, but he has given it to Brienne of Tarth for use in her quest to locate Sansa Stark. The blade was given its name, Oathkeeper, at that time.
Red Rain: The Valyrian steel sword of House Drumm stolen in a raid. Given the name and coloring, possibly the ancestral sword of House Reyne.
Widow's Wail: One of two Valyrian blades reforged by Tobho Mott from Ice. The blade was made for King Joffrey Baratheon as a wedding gift by his grandfather, Lord Tywin.

Michael Moorcock: Eternal Champion 
The Black Blade: Urlik Skarsol's sword.
Kanajana: Erekosë's sword.
Mournblade: The sword which is Stormbringer's twin, wielded by Elric's cousin, Yyrkoon.
Ravenbrand: Ulric von Bek's sword.
Stormbringer: Elric's sword. Stormbringer absorbs the souls of anyone it kills.
The Sword of the Dawn: Dorian Hawkmoon's sword.
Traitor: Corum Jhaelen Irsei's sword.

Christopher Paolini: The Inheritance Cycle 
Brisingr: Eragon's Dragon Rider's sword, it was crafted specifically for him by the elf Rhunön. It is a hand and a half sword with a blade that is slightly longer than normal. The glyph for "fire" is engraved upon both the blade and the scabbard. However, whereas Zar'roc is crimson in appearance, Brisingr is blue, with its blade, guard, hilt and scabbard each being a different hue. A sapphire rests in the pommel surrounded by four ribs which give the impression of the claws of a dragon clutching it. Whenever Eragon uttered its name the blade would become engulfed in blue flames. It is capable of cutting through magical wards.
Zar'roc: The sword of Dragon Rider Morzan. After his death, Brom kept it for safekeeping before eventually giving it to Eragon. At the Second Battle of the Burning Plains, Murtagh takes it from Eragon, claiming it as his own. It is a crimson sword; its scabbard is the color of wine, its blade the color of blood, with a ruby the size of an egg resting in the pommel.
Albitr: The sword of Angela, the herbalist, which she nicknamed "Tinkledeath" for the sound which it made. It is described as "the ultimate embodiment of an incline plane" and its blade was made of an undisclosed transparent substance. Angela claimed that it was the sharpest sword in the world and it was able to easily cut through four inches of solid granite. Its scabbard was made of an unknown material which not even the sword could cut through.
Arvindr: The sword of a deceased dragon rider of unknown origin. It was considered as a possible replacement weapon for Eragon before Brisingr was forged. However, it lay in the city of Nädindel, which would have taken too long to travel to.
Naegling: Oromis' gold-bronze sword. During their time in Du Weldenvarden, he and his dragon Glaedr stored vast amounts of energy into the sword's gem, a yellow diamond. Several elves also contributed energy to the point where there was said to be enough raw power contained within the sword to shift an entire mountain. Oromis used the sword in his duel with Eragon. He later lost it during his battle with Murtagh who placed magical wards around it, which prevented Oromis from retrieving it, leading to his death.
Támerlein: A two-handed sword designed primarily for slashing and cutting. Its pommel contained an emerald and the inscription, "I am Támerlein, bringer of the final sleep" was engraven upon its green blade. It originally belonged to the Elven Dragon Rider Arva. He gave it to his sister, Naudra, to defend herself when Galbatorix and the Forsworn attacked their homeland. When Eragon found himself in need of a new Rider's sword he sought permission to use the blade as his own. However, he ultimately rejected it and it was eventually, the sword was reworked for Arya, the Queen of the Elves, to use.
Undbitr: The Rider's sword of Brom. It was aquamarine in color and was lost during The Fall of the Dragon Riders.
Vrangr: Originally wielded by Vrael and called Islingr, or "light bringer". Vrael was the last leader of the Dragon Riders before they fell. After Galbatorix killed him he claimed it for his own and gave the sword its new name, which translated to "Awry" in the ancient language. The blade, guard and hilt are pure white, resembling the color "of a sun-bleached bone". An unspecified gem as clear as a mountain spring rests in the pommel.

Rick Riordan: Percy Jackson and the Olympians and Heroes of Olympus 
Anaklusmos: The sword of Perseus Jackson, it was given to Hercules by the hesperide, Zoe. Made of the fictional metal Celestial Bronze. Its name in English means Riptide.
Backbiter: The sword of Luke Castellan, it is made of two metals, Celestial Bronze and regular mortal steel.
Ivlivs: The sword of Jason Grace. It was first wielded by Julius Cesar. It was destroyed by the giants, and it was made of Imperial Gold.
Katoptris: The dagger of Piper McLean. It first belonged to Helen of Troy, a gift from Menelaus. Its name means Looking Glass. She has been able to see visions of the future in it, although they aren't always clear.

J. K. Rowling: Harry Potter 
The Sword of Gryffindor: The Sword of Godric Gryffindor, one of the founders of Hogwarts. It can only be wielded by a "true Gryffindor". In the last book, it is revealed that it is goblin-made, and therefore, the goblins claim ownership of it. However, when a true Gryffindor arises, the sword comes out of the Sorting Hat.

It is first pulled out by Harry Potter in Chamber of Secrets. It appears again and is drawn out of the Sorting Hat by Neville Longbottom in Deathly Hallows and used to kill the last Horcrux - Nagini the snake. The sword absorbs any substance that will strengthen it; for example, if immersed in poison, it gains the ability to poison its target. It also rejects any substance that would damage or tarnish it.

Fred Saberhagen: Books of the Swords 
The Twelve Swords of Power: Each possesses a unique magic property, were forged by Vulcan and capriciously scattered across a world in which technology had been replaced by magic and the deities of classical antiquity returned.
Coinspinner: the Sword of Chance - Symbol: dice
Doomgiver: the Sword of Justice - Symbol: hollow circle
Dragonslicer: the Sword of Heroes - Symbol: dragon
Farslayer: the Sword of Vengeance - Symbol: target; that is concentric rings
Mindsword: the Sword of Glory - Symbol: generic banner
Shieldbreaker: the Sword of Force - Symbol: hammer
Sightblinder: the Sword of Stealth - Symbol: human eye
Soulcutter: the Sword of Despair - Symbol: none
Stonecutter: the Sword of Siege - Symbol: a wedge, splitting a block
Townsaver: the Sword of Fury - Symbol: crenelated wall
Wayfinder: the Sword of Wisdom - Symbol: small white arrow
Woundhealer: the Sword of Mercy - Symbol: open hand

Brandon Sanderson: Cosmere 
Shardblades: Featured in The Stormlight Archive, shardblades are usually two handed swords capable of cutting through any nonliving material. Living beings that are struck by shardblades are not cut, but the wound causes an injury to the soul instead. Wounds from shardblades cause the affected area to go limp and become useless. Shardblades can be summoned by a wielder who has bonded one. Some characters are able to summon shardblades through a connection with supernatural creatures known as spren. A prominent shardblade, Oathbringer, is the namesake of the third book in the Stormlight Archive, which partially explores the sword's history with several of the main characters. 
Honorblades: The oldest known shardblades, given to a group of immortal beings known as Heralds by their namesake god and creator, Honor. Unlike typical shardblades, Honorblades grant their wielders the supernatural abilities of one of the orders of the Knights Radiant. The powers vary depending on the Honorblade that is used.
Nightblood: First featured in Warbreaker, Nightblood is a sentient sword that can communicate with its wielder. Drawing Nightblood usually causes those in the sword's vicinity to try and kill each other to claim the sword for themselves. Nightblood, when used, is capable of destroying almost any known foe or object, but its power consumes the essence or soul of the wielder, making its use incredibly dangerous. Nightblood itself has a somewhat innocent, almost childlike personality, appropriately unaware of many things about the world around it. Nightblood is bound by a single command: "Destroy evil," which because of its limited understanding of concepts of morality, causes some confusion when used in battle.
Koloss blades: Featured in the first trilogy of Mistborn books, these massive swords are used by ogre-like monsters known as koloss. The blades are too massive for any normal human to wield (Though some magic users can increase their strength and do so). The number of swords that a koloss band has influences that band's hierarchy. Due to the brutal lifestyle of the koloss and their generally low intelligence, the blades are not well maintained or even kept sharp, rendering many blunt, albeit still quite dangerous.

J. R. R. Tolkien: Middle-earth 
Glamdring: (Sindarin: foe-hammer) Nicknamed "Beater" by the Goblins. First owned and wielded by Turgon, king of Gondolin, it was later wielded by Gandalf the White.
Narsil: (Quenya: red fire-white brilliance; refers to the Sun and Moon as the great lights of the heavens) The sword of Elendil, broken when Elendil falls on it during his battle with Sauron. The hilt-shard is used to cut the One Ring from Sauron's hand by Isildur, Elendil's second son. The broken sword is an heirloom of the House of Elendil, and eventually comes into Aragorn's possession as the latest heir to the thrones of Arnor and Gondor. It is reforged and renamed Andúril (Quenya: West-brilliance, usually rendered as the Flame of the West), fulfilling the prophecy that it shall be forged anew when the One Ring is found again. Andúril serves as Aragorn's primary weapon and as a symbol of good to all who oppose Sauron. It is the literary opposite of the One Ring.
Orcrist: (Sindarin: orc/goblin-cleaver) Called "Biter" by the orcs; used by Thorin Oakenshield.
Ringil: (Quenya: cold-star) The sword of Fingolfin, king of the Noldor elves; used during his duel with Morgoth, the Great Enemy.
Sting: An Elven knife used as a sword by Bilbo, and later his nephew, Frodo. Sting has the characteristic of glowing when orcs are near, thus serving as an alert to its wielder.
Anglachel (Sindarin: iron-fire-star) and Anguirel (Sindarin: iron-eternal-star): Swords forged from meteoritic iron by Eöl, the dark elf. They could cleave all earth delved iron.
Gurthang: (Sindarin: death-iron) The sword formerly known as Anglachel. So named by Túrin Turambar, who wielded the sword until his suicide upon Gurthang's point. The sword is notable for apparently being sentient; it appeared to mourn the death of its former owner, the elf Beleg Cúthalion, and it spoke in response to being hailed by Túrin just before his death. It was found to have broken under Túrin after his death and the shards were buried with him.
Herugrim: (Rohirric: very fierce, savage) The sword of Théoden, king of Rohan.
Aranrúth: (Sindarin: king's-ire) The sword of Thingol, King of Doriath in Beleriand.
Gúthwinë: (Rohirric: battle-friend) The sword of Éomer.
Barrow-blade: The blades wielded by Frodo Baggins (until he obtained Sting), Samwise Gamgee, Meriadoc Brandybuck and Peregrin Took; given to them by Tom Bombadil from a tomb on the Barrow-downs.
Swords only appearing in the film adaptations:
Hadhafang: Elrond's sword from the Second Age.
Lhang: A variety of two-handed, curved bladed swords used by Elves.

Margaret Weis and Tracy Hickman: Darksword 
The Darksword: A sword wielded by Joram. It is made of darkstone/iron, which has the ability to absorb Life (magic). Weapons forged from darkstone need to be infused with Life from a catalyst and can only be effectively wielded by the Dead (devoid of magical power), who have no magic to be absorbed.

Tad Williams: Memory, Sorrow, and Thorn 

Memory, Sorrow, and Thorn are three legendary swords key to the plot of the trilogy.

 Memory (also known as Minneyar, "Year of Memory"), was forged out of a keel.
 Sorrow, described as an unholy blade, was forged out of black iron and witchwood, a material used by the Sithi.
 Thorn is made out of ore retrieved from a meteorite ("sky-stone"), with a hilt fashioned to resemble a holy tree.

Gene Wolfe: The Book of the New Sun 
Terminus Est: The sword carried by Severian, the Torturer. It contains liquid metal (mercury, but referred to by its Latin name hydrargyrum) within the blade, making it hard to lift and giving more power on the downswing.

Roger Zelazny: The Chronicles of Amber 
Grayswandir: A sword used by Corwin of Amber. Grayswandir is associated with the Moon and the night.
Werewindle: Also called Rawg; a golden-colored sword used by Brand of Amber. Werewindle is inscribed with portions of the Pattern, and is also associated with the Sun and day.

Various authors: Dungeons & Dragons 
Clamorer: The sword of Peirgeiron Paladinson, Lord of Waterdeep.
Hill Cleaver: The holy avenger sword of Dragonbait. 
Godsbane: The sword wielded by Cyric during the Time of Troubles. It actually was a disguised Avatar of Mask.
Icingdeath and Twinkle: The twin scimitars wielded by Drizzt Do'Urden.
Dark Swords: Swords made of strands of shadow essence, wielded by the warriors of Vaasa. If an improper user held the blades, the blades hilt would freeze their hands.
Druniazth: Thermophagic sword; the name is an anagram of the deity to which it is connected, Tharizdun, "the Chained Oblivion".
Spike Sword
Khazid'hea: "Cutter" in the drow language, a sentient sword taken from Dantrag Baenre and wielded briefly by Catti-Brie.
Charon's Claw: The sword wielded by Artemis Entreri, a netherese blade that killed anyone who touched it unless they either mentally overpowered it, or used the paired gauntlet. It could leave trails of hanging opaque ash to serve as optical barriers, and the gauntlet could catch and redirect magic.

Andrzej Sapkowski: The Witcher 
 Zirael (in Elder Speech: Swallow) is a sword given to Ciri by the blacksmith Esterhazy. Leo Bonhart, who enthralled Ciri, wanted to buy this sword for Ciri and make her fight in arenas. Zirael was a gwyhyr, which is a type of sword produced by gnomes. On the sword's blade is the elvish glyph Blathanna Caerme (in Elder Speech: Destiny Wreath).
 Sihill was a sword made by dwarves. According to the Witcher Saga, Sihill's first owner was the dwarf Zoltan Chivay, who gave the sword to witcher Geralt of Riva. It has the dwarven glyph on it, which says: For damnation of whoresons.

In other fiction

Brandon Mull's Fablehaven

 Vasilis was the sword of light and darkness. Wielded first by Seth Sorenson, then by his sister, Kendra Sorenson. Seth used it to slay Nagi Luna and Graulas. Kendra used it to slay Gorgrog, the demon king.

Andrew Hussie's Homestuck
 Unbreakable Katana: Bro and Dirk Strider's main weapon of choice.
 Regisword: Jack Noir's sword.
 Caledfwlch: An alchemized sword which Dave Strider uses for some time.
 Caledscratch: An alchemized sword with time-altering qualities which Dave Strider uses for some time.
 Snoop Dogg Snow Cone Machete: An alchemized sword with time-altering qualities which Dave Strider uses for some time.
 Royal Deringer: A sword given to a doomed timeline's Dave Strider by his denizen Hephaestus in the Forge.
 sord.....: An alchemized sword of terrible quality covered in jpeg artifacts, which Dave Strider uses for some time.
 Ancestral Awakening Sword: A sword which can be materialised by Vriska Serket when she uses her Fluorite Octet.
 Scarlet Ribbitar: An alchemized sword which Dave Strider uses for some time.
 Cutlass of Zillywair: An alchemized sword from legendary cherubim folklore. Jade Harley wields it temporarily.

Nintendo's The Legend of Zelda
Master Sword: From "The Legend of Zelda", also referred to as "the Blade of Evil's Bane" and "the Sword that Seals the Darkness". It said that no one with an evil heart can even wield the blade. It also said that only a member or a descendant of the bloodline of the Knights of Hyrule can pull it from its pedestal. It is often wielded by the various incarnations of the hero, Link in order to defend Hyrule from Ganon and other evil forces. In some games, when at full power the blade shines with the power to repel evil and protects its wielder from certain types of harmful magic.
Fierce Deity Sword: From "The Legend of Zelda", is a large, peculiar greatsword with a unique double-helix design which has caused it to become known as the "Double-Helix Sword" among fans before it was officially named in Breath of the Wild. It is wielded two-handed. The blade first appears in Majora's Mask.
Four Sword: From "The Legend of Zelda", another sword wielded by Link that has the power to split its wielder into four copies. In Minish Cap, it is revealed to have been forged by the Minish. 
Sword of Sages: From "The Legend of Zelda", it is a holy sword created by the Six Ancient Sages to execute and seal away the Dark Lord Ganondorf. It first appeared in "Twilight Princess" during a flashback of Ganondorf's failed execution.
Biggoron Sword: From "The Legend of Zelda", is a greatsword forged by the giant Goron blacksmith, Biggoron. It is so large that Link must wield it with two hands, preventing him from using his shield.

Nintendo's Fire Emblem
Falchion: A sword from the Fire Emblem series, it is wielded by Marth, the prince of Altea in Fire Emblem: Shadow Dragon, Alm in Fire Emblem Gaiden, and Chrom, the prince of Ylisse in Fire Emblem Awakening. In Awakening, Chrom's daughter Lucina travels from the future wielding the Parallel Falchion to prevent his death and avert a global calamity. In the final support conversation between Lucina and her possible siblings (depending on who is Lucina's mother), it is implied they are also capable of wielding the sword. It is indirectly suggested that the Falchion wielded by Alm is a distinct weapon from the one wielded by Marth and his descendants, and that both are forged from the fangs of dragons.
Tyrfing: A sword in Fire Emblem: Genealogy of the Holy War, it is wielded by Sigurd and later his son Seliph. It was once wielded by the Crusader of Light, Baldr, bestowed upon him during the Miracle of Darna. Tyrfing is the property of the descendants of Baldr, who founded House Chalphy of Grannvale.
Mystletainn: A sword in Fire Emblem: Genealogy of the Holy War. It is wielded by Eldigan and can later be wielded by Ares. It's a blade that was once wielded by Crusader Hoðr, bestowed upon him during the Miracle of Dahna.
Balmung: A sword in Fire Emblem: Genealogoy of the Holy War, it is the sword of the Crusader Od, representing the kingdom of Isaach. Shannan is the only character capable of wielding Balmung.
Durandal: A sword in Fire Emblem: The Blazing Blade that was wielded by Roland during The Scouring and was effective at purging the dragons during the event. After its seal was disturbed, it was wielded by Eliwood who is a descendant of Roland along with Hector. After accidentally killing Ninian in her ice dragon form with the sword, Eliwood couldn't bring himself to wield Durandal again until the final battle against Nergal, his morphs, and a Fire Dragon that he managed to summon.
Binding Blade: A sword wielded by Roy who wields it during the final chapters of Fire Emblem: The Binding Blade. The sword is said to be stronger than the other legendary weapons of Elibe, and was sealed at the Shrine of Seals by Hartmut, who was also the founder of the Kingdom of Bern. 
Sieglinde: A slender sword wielded by Eirika in Fire Emblem: The Sacred Stones. Also known as the Thunder Sword, it is one of the Sacred Twins of the country Renais, along with the Flame Lance Siegmund, wielded by Eirika's brother Ephraim.
Audhulma: A legendary sword appearing in Fire Emblem: The Sacred Stones. One of the Sacred Twins of the nation of Jehanna, it is also called the Ice Sword. It can be wielded by any player unit with high enough proficiency in swordsmanship.
Ragnell: A weapon wielded by Ike in the games Fire Emblem: Path of Radiance and Fire Emblem: Radiant Dawn.  Ragnell has a golden blade. It is a broad and heavy two-handed sword, but Ike wields it easily in one hand and can use it to fire waves of energy at distant enemies. It was originally wielded by Altina, the founder and first Apostle of Begnion; the goddess Ashera consecrated the sword for Altina's service to her in war. As a sacred treasure of Begnion, it was eventually inherited by its top general, Zelgius, also known as the Black Knight. The Black Knight offered it to his teacher and Ike's father, Greil, in order to have a proper sword duel; after Greil's defeat, the Black Knight leaves Ragnell behind so that Ike can take it. Generations after the events of Path of Radiance and Radiant Dawn, the sword is wielded by Ike's descendant Priam in Fire Emblem Awakening.
Alondite: A weapon wielded by the Black Knight in Fire Emblem: Path of Radiance and Fire Emblem: Radiant Dawn. It is the silver counterpart to Ragnell, bearing an identical design and function besides. Like Ragnell, it was wielded by Altina and blessed by Ashera. After offering Ragnell to Greil, the Black Knight defeats him in a duel, killing him with Alondite. In his guise as the Black Knight, Zelgius openly carries the blade, up to the point of his death in the Goddess Tower. Once claimed by Ike, it can be wielded by any member of the army with sufficient skill in the sword.
Yato: A sword in Fire Emblem Fates, it is wielded by Corrin, the main protagonist of Fire Emblem Fates. Long before the events of the game, there was a war between twelve dragons. One of the dragons, the Rainbow Sage, forged five divine weapons: Yato, Raijinto, Fujin Yumi, Siegfried, and Brynhildr. Humanity was selected to wield these weapons, which plunged them into the war. If the Yato and one of the other weapons collide their powers together, the Yato will gain a new form, depending on the weapons it collides with. If the Yato collides with all of the weapons, it will transform into its true form, the Omega Yato.
Raijinto: A sword in Fire Emblem Fates, it was originally wielded by the former king of Hoshido, Sumeragi, but is now wielded by his son, Ryoma, the high prince of Hoshido. It is a katana that shoots electricity.  Long before the events of Fates, there was a war between twelve dragons. One of the dragons, the Rainbow Sage, forged five divine weapons: Yato, Raijinto, Fujin Yumi, Siegfried, and Brynhildr. Humanity was selected to wield these weapons, which plunged them into the war.
Siegfried: A sword in Fire Emblem Fates, it is wielded by Xander, the crown prince of Nohr. It is a sword that shoots dark energy. Long before the events of Fates, there was a war between twelve dragons. One of the dragons, the Rainbow Sage, forged five divine weapons: Yato, Raijinto, Fujin Yumi, Siegfried, and Brynhildr. Humanity was selected to wield these weapons, which plunged them into the war.
Sword of the Creator: A sword in Fire Emblem: Three Houses. One of the Hero's Relics of Fódlan, it was initially wielded by Nemesis, the King of Liberation. The sword is then wielded by Byleth after it was revealed that they possess the Crest of Flames to wield it. The sword is crafted from the bones of the ancient dragon progenitor goddess, Sothis.
Blutgang: A sword in Fire Emblem: Three Houses, it is a Hero's Relic that was wielded by Maurice, one of the Elite who served Nemesis. Over time however, Maurice overused the weapon and due to this, fused with the weapon to transform into a demonic creature known as the Wandering Beast. If defeated, his descendant Marianne von Edmund retrieves the relic and becomes the new wielder of the weapon.
Thunderbrand: A sword in Fire Emblem: Three Houses, it is a Hero's Relic that was the relic of the House of Charon. It's wielded by Catherine, the famed knight of Seiros, as she possesses the Crest of Charon. She has wielded the sword since her service within the Holy Kingdom of Faerghus, even after she was accused of being involved in a plot which led to the death of Lord Lonato's son, Christophe.

Other
Balaraw: Also known as Espada ni Panday, literally "Meteorite Sword", it is the sword of the fictional Filipino hero Panday.
Chaz: A sentient magical sword in the webcomic Sluggy Freelance, whose magical abilities are activated when soaked in innocent blood.
Crucible: A blade of energy featured in DOOM Eternal that requires charge to use, killing enemies in a single hit. It is also featured in DOOM (2016).
Hina: A cursed katana in Love Hina possessing the spirit of an enemy that once fought the entire line of Shinmei-Ryu swordsmen to near extinction, and capable of possessing its wielder, human or animal. Belonging to the Urashima clan, Keitaro Urashima gives it to Motoko Aoyama after her sword Shisui breaks.
Tessaiga: A sword wielded by the half-demon Inuyasha, from the same anime. It is the opposite of Sesshōmaru's inherited sword, the Tenseiga. Out of the two, Tessaiga was "the sword of destruction", while Tenseiga was "the sword of life".
Kijin-marukuni-shige: A katana belonging to foreign-exchange student Susan in Chapter 1, Volume 8 of High School DxD.
Rain Dragon: The sword owned by Judge Dee in the novels of Robert van Gulik
Shisui: Shisui (止水; Stopping Water) is a white-wood shirasaya (a katana without a tsuba/guard) wielded by Motoko Aoyama throughout most of Love Hina. Originally Tsuruko Aoyama's favored sword, she passed it on to her sister as a farewell gift.
Singing Sword: The sword of Prince Valiant, sister sword to Excalibur. It was given to Valiant by his former rival Prince Arn. In Knighty Knight Bugs, Bugs Bunny has to recover it from Yosemite Sam.
St. Michael's Sword: A sword from the novel Riptide. It is said to have the power to kill anyone who looks at it. In reality, it can also kill its wielder, being forged from a meteorite composed of radioactive iridium-80, an isotope of iridium, one second of direct exposure equivalent to a lethal dose. (A reading of 3217.89 Rads/hr is recorded from fifty feet away).
Yūnagi: Yūnagi (夕凪; Evening Calm) is the nodachi of Setsuna Sakurazaki of Negima, given to her by Eishun Konoe.
Z Sword: From "Dragon Ball Z" is a large broadsword in which the Kaioshin, Old Kai was sealed within by God of Destruction Beerus after an argument between the two during a meeting between the Kaioshin & the Gods of Destruction that occurred 75 million years ago.
Brave Sword: From "Dragon Ball Z" is a longsword used by Tapion and Kid Trunks in the DBZ film "Wrath of the Dragon" and is depicted as a mystical weapon forged by a Konatsian Wizard to combat Hirudegarn who was cut in two by the blade and sealed with Tapion and his brother. 
Sword of Chaos: The sword wielded by Sarevok during the events of Baldur's Gate, and acquired by the protagonist in Baldur's Gate: Shadows of Amn (Forgotten Realms).
Keyblade: The weapon Sora wields in "Kingdom Hearts". As the name suggests, the Keyblade is a sword used as the key to lock and unlock the paths between other worlds. Its appearance and abilities change depending on what key chain Sora equips to the blade. Along with Sora, many other characters have been seen with their own variations of the Keyblade, such as King Mickey and Riku.
Most important swords in The Witcher (game series) are: Aerondight - sword referring to Lancelot's blade Arondight; Zirael - the name of two swords used by Cirilla, its name means Swallow in Elder Speech.
Dragon Buster: The weapon created by Winglies to kill dragons and dragoons during the Dragon Campaign in "The Legend of Dragoon". When the sword is used, a glowing mass appears around the hand and several tentacles come out of the user's wrist and the sword forms. The handle is in the shape of a large red dragon's head and the blade is an ethereal blade of yellow-orange flame that can be adjusted in length. Thus the sword as a whole resembles a dragon breathing fire. It is used by Lloyd to kill the Jade Dragoon, Lavitz. It is later used by the Dark Dragoon, Rose, and Red Dragoon, Zieg, to kill the wingly, Melbu Frahma.
Buster Sword: Cloud Strife's initial weapon in Final Fantasy VII, it is a large and rather simple greatsword. Originally wielded by Angeal Hewley, in Crisis Core: Final Fantasy VII, it was passed onto Zack Fair, who in turn would come to pass it onto Cloud in his dying moments.
Luck & Pluck: The sword given to Jonathan Joestar as a gift from the defeated Bruford. He would then use it against the main antagonist Dio Brando.
Tsumehirameki: From Arifureta: From Commonplace to World's Strongest, a Kissaki Moroha Zukuri style double edged Katana, one of the masterpieces of the protagonist Hajime Nagumo which he gave to one of his future lovers Shizuku Yaegashi as a gift
Murata-Tou: A Meiji era Gunto crafted by Tsuneyoshi Murata of the Imperial Japanese Army, given to Saeko Busujima in Highschool of the Dead.
Golden Sword of Fire: One of the Four Golden weapons from Lego's Ninjago Theme. Initially used alongside the other Golden Weapons to create the realm of Ninjago, it is claimed by Kai, the Elemental Master of Fire. In the Show's third season, the Golden Weapons are melted, and in the show's tenth season, a piece of golden armor is destroyed to reforge the Golden Weapons.
Greinkel: Roland Days's sword in the Forged Fates series.
Dragonslayer: The impossibly large greatsword wielded by Guts in the manga series Berserk. A king asked the blacksmith who forged it to make a sword that could kill a dragon; since dragons don't exist, the blacksmith made the giant blade as a sarcastic response. The blacksmith kept it as decoration and a reminder of his failure, until Guts proved capable of actually wielding it.
Mythcarver: Appearing in Season One of the YouTube series, Critical Role, and also in the Amazon Prime show based on the YouTube series, The Legend of Vox Machina, Mythcarver is a legendary longsword bestowed upon the bard, Scanlan Shorthalt. Mythcarver is one of the Vestiges of the Divergence that aids Vox Machine in defeating the Chroma Conclave.

In film and television

Bionicle
The Fire Sword: Tahu Mata's Toa Tool. It could be used to channel Tahu's Fire powers. This tool was also used by Akamai, a being resulting in the fusion of Tahu, Onua, and Pohatu. The Firesword was changed into twin Magma Swords when Tahu was transformed into a Toa Nuva by Energized Protodermis.
The Ice Sword: Kopaka's Toa Tool as a Toa Mata, along with his Ice Shield. It is used to channel his Ice powers. Before he became a Toa Nuva, Kopaka had only one blade, but it was less powerful. Afterwards, he had two and they could be transformed into ice skates.
The Magma Swords: Used by Tahu Nuva, they are able to turn into a surfboard. A similar set of swords, the Fire Great Swords are used by Toa Lhikan.
The Air Sword: Toa Lesovikk's Toa Tool. It can be used to channel his Elemental Power of Air.
The Air Katanas: Toa Lewa Nuva's Toa Tools. He can hold them up to his sides as glider wings, or spin them as seen in BIONICLE: Mask of Light. Reidak snapped one of Lewa Nuva's Air Katana in half over his knee in BIONICLE Legends 1: Island of Doom. The other was confiscated after he was knocked unconscious and put in the Piraka Stronghold. Lewa was later able to retrieve it when they raided it. After the Voya Nui Resistance Team had rescued the Toa Nuva, one of them had offered to make Lewa a new Katana.
The Aqua Warblade: Hewkii Mahri's Toa Tool and is one of the finest weapons in existence. It is said to be one of the finest swords ever made, designed to be used only by a master warrior. While Hewkii has had this weapon ever since he became a Toa Mahri, he seems to channel his Stone powers through his hands instead.
Aero Slicers: Matau's Toa tools. Used to channel his elemental power of air. He was also able to attach them to his back and use them as glider wings and rotors. They were strong enough to cut through energy fields.
The Fire Great Swords: Two enormous blades owned by Toa Lihkan and seen in Bionicle 2: Legends of Metru Nui released in October 2004. They connect along the toothed blade to make a shield that also works as a lava surf board.

Crouching Tiger, Hidden Dragon
The Green Destiny: Mu Bai's sword which he gives to his friend Sir Te.

The Golden Blade
 The Sword of Damaskus: A golden sword that can cut anything and makes its wielder invincible is used by Harun Al-Rashid (Rock Hudson) to free a fairy-tale Bagdad from Jafar, the evil usurper of the throne.

Heroes
The Kensei Sword: A katana wielded by Takezo Kensei, and later by Hiro Nakamura

Hook
Pan Sword: The sword of Peter Pan, it consists of a gold blade and a hilt made from a coconut. After Peter left Neverland and grew up, the lost boy Rufio took the sword and became the new Pan. When Peter came back to rescue his children, Rufio returned the sword to him. After defeating Captain Hook in a final duel, Peter gives the sword to Thud Butt, the largest of the Lost Boys, telling him to watch over all who are smaller than him. The sword has no magical powers; however, it sometimes seems to sing when a new owner, or an original owner, holds it.

Kill Bill
The sword of Hattori Hanzō: A sword used by The Bride (Uma Thurman) and forged by a legendary Japanese swordsmith.

KonoSuba
Chunchunmaru : Kazuma's shortened katana sword he generally wears on his belt, named by Megumin in the 6th episode of the season 2. It was the first katana created in the world of KonoSuba by a blacksmith following Kazuma's instructions.

Masters of the Universe
Power Sword: Also known as the Sword of Power, this was given to Prince Adam by the Sorceress of Grayskull as the key to transforming into He-Man, "the Most Powerful Man in the Universe", and transforming his cowardly pet tiger, Cringer, into the fierce and brave Battle Cat.
Sword of Protection: The Sword of Protection is the weapon wielded by Adora. Prince Adam's twin sister, and is used in her transformation into the heroic She-Ra. It also changes her horse, Spirit, into the winged unicorn, Swift Wind.

Power Rangers
Power Sword: The default weapon of the original Red Ranger, Jason Lee Scott and later his successor, Rocky DeSantos. Its blade could be energized with red energy, for instance, when Jason was battling the evil Green Ranger, and energized the blade before throwing it towards the Green Ranger, knocking the Sword of Darkness out of his hands.
Sword of Darkness: The sword that the then-evil Green Ranger, Tommy, used. It allowed Rita to maintain her evil spell on Tommy and gave Tommy extraordinary power. Jason destroyed it, and Tommy was able to break free and join the Power Rangers.
Sword of Power: A powerful sword that could give extra power to a Ranger that holds it. It could only be summoned when all six Rangers were present and combined their powers. In the episode "The Green Dream", Lord Zedd put Tommy in a trance to steal the sword for his monster, RoboGoat, which made it extra powerful. Tommy was released from the trance upon giving up the sword and tried to get it back, but RoboGoat greatly weakened his Green Ranger power. Jason, the Red Ranger, faced RoboGoat one-on-one and got the sword back for Zordon.In the original draft script for the Green Dream, Lord Zedd claims the Sword of Power was created from the remains of the Sword of Darkness. This is also stated by the announcer's intro to The Green Dream episode claiming it to be the Sword of Darkness.
Sword of Light: A sword that allowed Zordon to transfer the powers of Rangers to new chosen Rangers. Zordon used it only once on Jason Lee Scott, Zack Taylor, and Trini Kwan in order make Rocky DeSantos, Adam Park, and Aisha Campbell the new Red, Black, and Yellow Rangers.
Saba: A talking saber with the head of a tiger which granted Tommy Oliver, as the White Ranger, control of the Tigerzord. It also assisted Tommy in piloting the Zord. Saba was able to levitate and shoot energy out of his eyes. Though Saba was created by the power of Thunder, he was restored after Tommy gained the White Ninja Ranger powers.
Zeo Sword: The personal weapon of Zeo Ranger V, Tommy Oliver, in Power Rangers: Zeo.
Turbo Sword: A sword carried by each Turbo Ranger. The handle could be pulled back for an extra power boost.
Turbo Lightning Sword: The Red Turbo Ranger's personal weapon.
Spiral Saber: The Red Ranger's personal weapon in Power Rangers in Space. It featured a distinct drill-like blade, and could be combined with an Astro Blaster and equipped with a "Booster" attachment at the blade's tip to increase its firepower.
Super Silverizer: The Silver Ranger's personal weapon doubles as a blaster and a sword in Power Rangers in Space.
Quasar Sabers: A quintet of legendary swords that rested on the Planet Mirinoi for over 3,000 years awaiting the chosen ones in Power Rangers: Lost Galaxy. Once released from the stone, the Sabers granted each of their wielders Ranger powers. They can be charged up to unleash their elemental powers.
 Magna Blaster: Magna Defender's signature rifle can also transform into a sword when the gun's handle is bent back and pulled out.
 Savage Sword: A sword that was said to be more powerful than the Quasar Sabers combined. It grew more powerful after each successful hit. The Pink Psycho Ranger managed to retrieve it to fight the Space and Galaxy Rangers, even destroying the Pink Space Ranger's Astro Morpher. The Pink Galaxy Ranger sacrificed her life to restore the Morpher and destroy the sword.
 Chrono Sabers: Each Ranger, in Power Rangers: Time Force, carries two Chrono Sabers, which can also double as a lance. In battle, the Chrono Sabers can fire energy projectiles and are used to deliver a Time Strike. The Rangers can also spin around like a tornado and strike an opponent.
 Quantum Defender: Wes the Quantum Ranger's personal firearm can change into a sword. Can deliver its own "Blizzard Slash" where it charges with blue energy and slashes the enemy two times. It can be used to give the Q-Rex more power to destroy Doomtron in the final battle.
 Golden Eagle Sword: Yellow Ranger's primary weapon, in Power Rangers: Wild Force.
 Ninja Swords: The Ninja Storm basic sword. This weapon can transform in lasers
 Golden Ninja Swords: A powered version of the Ninja Swords; with this weapon, each Ranger can make a special element slash
 Samurai Saber: The personal weapon of the Green Samurai Ranger; with this weapon, Cam can produce a Power Slash.
 Thundermax Saber: The basic sword of Dino Thunder
 SPD practice Katana: A basic katana for practice. Jack uses this weapon but was useless against the Shadow Saber.
 Shadow Saber: This is the personal blade of the Shadow Ranger. With this sword, Crugger can deflect bullets and slice the enemy like butter.
 Excelsior: A sword sought by Thrax, it was held by a female statue that eventually came to life after seeing the determination of the then-powerless Operation Overdrive Rangers and deemed them worthy of wielding the sword.
 Sentinel Sword: Sentinel Knight merged with Excelsior, giving him the ability to transform into a sword which the Rangers could carry and wield. By turning the knob on its hilt, it transforms him back into the Sentinel Knight. He can also enlarge and was wielded in battle by the DriveMax Megazord.

Star Trek
Bat'leth: Ceremonial swords used by members of the Klingon race.
Kar'takin:These straight-bladed polearms are used by the Jem'Hadar in close combat. They were used by both Starfleet officers and Jem'Hadar in the Star Trek: Deep Space Nine episode "To the Death". The Kar'takin bear a resemblance to the Bardiche axe.

Star Wars
Lightsaber: The lightsaber, also referred to as a laser sword by those who were unfamiliar with it, was a weapon usually used by the Jedi, the Sith, and other Force-sensitives. Lightsabers consisted of a plasma blade, powered by a kyber crystal, that was emitted from a usually metal hilt and could be shut off at will. It was a weapon that required skill and training, and was greatly enhanced when used in conjunction with the Force.

Sword Art Online
Anneal Blade: A simple one-handed sword viable up to floor 3 of Aincrad. Kirito obtained this sword the first day of SAO's launch.
Elucidator: A pitch black sword, evenly balanced and quite powerful. It has a black handle connected to a hand guard that is longer on the right side. Attached to this elongated area of the hand-guard is part of Elucidator's obsidian blade so as to better aid the user in retaining their grip on the sword when it is being used. The blade is completely black like the rest of the sword and said blade is outlined in a light gray. A small cross is embroidered on the flat of the blade, just beneath the tip.
Lambent Light: The rapier used by Asuna. Has a blue handle and a circular guard.
Guilty Thorn: A custom-made barbed blade created by the player Grimlock. It is red with white outline and alternating teeth on both sides of the blade.
Dark Repulser: Another sword used by Kirito. It was forged by Lisbeth in the side story "Warmth of Heart" using a Crystallite Ingot. The stats indicate that it can rival even the Elucidator. It is destroyed in the fight with Kayaba Akihiko.

Slayers
Sword of Light: Wielded by Gourry Gabriev. The metal blade could be removed from the hilt, allowing Gourry to summon a blade of coherent magical energy that could affect creatures immune to normal weapons or to most magic. The energy blade could also serve as a spell focus, and was used as such by Lina Inverse. In the anime, it was one of the five Dark Star weapons and also given the name "Gorun Nova".
Howling Sword: The weapon of the mercenary swordsman Zangalus. Crafted by the corrupted "great priest" Rezo, the Howling Sword could generate great gusts of wind.

Thundarr the Barbarian
Sunsword: wielded by Thundarr uses as a weapon in his fight against evil wizards and other villains.

ThunderCats
Sword of Omens: Wielded by Lion-O, "Lord Of The ThunderCats"; used in battle to achieve "sight beyond sight" and to project a visual signal into the sky, accompanied by an audible roar, to alert and summon the other ThunderCats.

Voltron
"Blazing Swords" were wielded by each of the unified Voltrons in the anime cartoons syndicated to the United States. Usually employed in battle against "robeasts", they were capable of cutting through virtually any solid substance known and/or piercing almost any strength of force-field.

Zatoichi
Shikomizue: The blind swordsman Zatoichi's weapon in the Japanese series of movies. It is a sword hidden in a cane, with a dagger hidden in the hilt.

Nasuverse
Caliburn: The sword that Arthur took out of the stone, engraved with the words "Whosoe'er pulleth out this sword of this stone is rightwise king born of England". Its appearance is similar to Excalibur, which was given to Arthur by the Lady of the Lake.
Arondight: A holy sword wielded by Lancelot that is the counterpart of King Arthur's Excalibur. It was given only to someone who could be exalted as the "perfect knight", the strongest, bravest and truest knight of an era, which signifies the unrivaled Lancelot out of all those who sat at the Round Table of Camelot.
Excalibur Galatine: The shining sword that Sir Gawain possesses. It is the sister-sword of Excalibur also originally owned by the Lady of the Lake, but it is not as well known as a holy sword and rarely mentioned due to having its legend hidden in the shadow of King Arthur's holy sword. While Excalibur collects the lights from the planet, Sir Gawain's holy sword is said to represent the rays of heat from the sun with a Pseudo-Sun contained in the hilt
Caladbolg: The sword wielded by Fergus mac Róich, with which he redirected his anger at not being able to kill the one who tricked him out of kingship by cleaninly blasting the top of three hills like a long rainbow.
 Kanshou and Bakuya: "Married" twin swords forged by Gan Jiang and Mo Ye, they represent Ying and Yang. The main ability of the swords is their strong bond with each other, which not only allows them to attract each other, but it is also said they will return their owner even if events cause them to be lost. If one is thrown while the other is held, the thrown sword will return to the wielder much like a boomerang. They are wielded by Servant Archer.
 Ea: The single most powerful weapon in existence, Ea can – at full power – destroy the entire world. It is something that was born before the appearance of the concept that the world calls a "sword", so it is not something that can truly be called a sword or have the shape of any known blade and it is the only sword that does not exist in the current world. It is something that does not appear in any modern legends, crystallized during the Age of Gods at the beginning of the world. It is possessed by Gilgamesh, and is the only sword that Archer and Emiya cannot Trace.
 Merodach:The Original Sin ( 原罪メロダック, GenzaiMerodakku) is the original model of the "legends of swords of selection in the various lands of the world" and "the foundation of the sacred right to select the king", including Gram and the sword modeled on Gram, Caliburn. It is possessed by Gilgamesh in the Gate of Babylon. It utilizes the same power as Caliburn, a "light that can burn away everything it touches"
 Durandal: The Peerless Sword is the holy sword favored by Roland and one of the many Noble Phantasms stored in Gilgamesh's Gate of Babylon. The sword is a splendidly forged "symbol of power" much like King Arthur's Caliburn, and it is said to hold three miracles within it. It will not lose its sharpness even should its user's magical energy be depleted, proving indestructible even when Roland tried to destroy it.
 Harpe: Immortal Slaying Scythe is a divine sword from Greek mythology used by Perseus to kill the Gorgon Medusa. It was given by Hermes, and as it was returned to him once the task was completed, it can be called an "Anti-Medusa" weapon. 
 Crocea Mors: Yellow Death is the golden sword of Gaius Julius Caesar, endowed with an ability in close-range combat that makes victory assured from the moment he sees the enemy.

See also
 Flaming sword (mythology)
 List of historical swords
 List of magical weapons
 List of mythological swords
 Magic sword
 Sword of Damocles

References

Further reading

External links
The Museum of Fictional Literary Artifacts — Weaponry

 
Swords
fictional